Pubarche refers to the first appearance of pubic hair at puberty. Pubarche is one of the physical changes of puberty and can occur independently of complete puberty. Pubarche usually results from rising levels of androgen and not estrogens in females, and androgens in males from the adrenal glands, ovaries, or testes but may also result from exposure to an anabolic steroid.

When pubarche occurs prematurely (in early or mid-childhood), it is referred to as premature pubarche or precocious puberty and may warrant an evaluation. Premature adrenarche is the most common cause of premature pubarche. Early occurrences can arise due to congenital adrenal hyperplasia, androgen-producing tumors of the adrenals or gonads. When adrenarche, central puberty, and all pathologic conditions have been excluded, the term isolated premature pubarche is used to describe the unexplained development of pubic hair at an early age without other hormonal or physical changes of puberty.

Average age

The average beginning of pubarche varies due to many factors, including climate, nourishment, weight, nurture, and genes. First (and often transient) pubic hair resulting from adrenarche may appear between ages 10–12 at the beginning of puberty.

See also
Androgens
Menarche
Puberty
Spermarche
Thelarche

References

External links
e-medicine

Developmental stages
Human development
Pubic hair
Sexuality and age